Gabriela Koeva (born 25 July 1989 in Pleven) is a Bulgarian female volleyball player.

After playing for VC CSKA Sofia in her home country between 2007 and 2009, she transferred to Voléro Zürich in Switzerland, where she played for two seasons until 2011. In the 2011-12 season, Koeva was with Minerva Volley Pavia in Italy. In November 2012, she signed for Beşiktaş Women's Volleyball.

Currently (season 2016-2017) Gabriela is playing her second season in the Azerbaijan championship, wearing the jersey of Telekom Baku.

Achievements
 2011 Women's European Volleyball League - Bulgarian national team 
 Swiss Cup
 Championship of Switzerland

References

External links
 

1989 births
Sportspeople from Pleven
Living people
Bulgarian women's volleyball players
Beşiktaş volleyballers
European Games competitors for Bulgaria
Volleyball players at the 2015 European Games
Middle blockers
Expatriate volleyball players in Switzerland
Expatriate volleyball players in Turkey
Expatriate volleyball players in Azerbaijan
Bulgarian expatriate sportspeople in Switzerland
Bulgarian expatriate sportspeople in Turkey
Bulgarian expatriate sportspeople in Azerbaijan